Adath Shalom ( "Congregation/Community of Peace") may refer to the following Jewish synagogues:

 Adath Shalom (Ottawa)
 Adath Shalom (Philadelphia)
 Adath Shalom Synagogue